Aliona Dubinina (born September 22, 1999) is a Belarusian acrobatic gymnast. With Artur Beliakou, she competed in the 2014 Acrobatic Gymnastics World Championships.

References

External links 

 

1999 births
Living people
Belarusian acrobatic gymnasts
Female acrobatic gymnasts